Everyone Is Everybody Else is the fifth studio album by British Rock Band Barclay James Harvest released in June 1974. This was their first album for the Polydor label after they had parted company with EMI.

The album was produced by Rodger Bain, who had previously worked with Black Sabbath in producing their first three albums. He also produced heavy rock bands Judas Priest and Budgie. There was said to be strained relations between Bain and the band, due to the preference of his musical style, with the band unhappy with the results of the song "Child of the Universe" in particular; Woolly Wolstenholme's only contribution was also left off the original album.

The album was played extensively on Radio Caroline, particularly the tracks "For No One" (whose lyrics contain the title of the album) and "Child of the Universe". The album was voted by Radio Caroline listeners at No. 13 on  the Top 100 All Time Album Chart. The album led to a BBC Radio 1 session with John Peel.

Track listing

Personnel 
Barclay James Harvest
John Lees – lead and acoustic guitars; lead vocals (tracks 1, 4, 6, 8, 9), backing vocals (tracks 1, 3, 4, 7-9)
Les Holroyd – bass, acoustic and rhythm guitars; lead vocals (tracks 2, 3, 5, 7), backing vocals (tracks 1, 3, 4, 7-9), "picked" guitar (tracks 7, 8)
Stewart "Woolly" Wolstenholme – keyboards; backing vocals  (tracks 1, 3, 4, 9)
Mel Pritchard – drums, percussion; backing vocals (track 1)

Additional personnel
Rodger Bain – producer
Rufus Cartwright – engineer
Ted Sharp – engineer, mixing engineer
Alex Agor – photography

References

1974 albums
Barclay James Harvest albums
Albums produced by Rodger Bain
Polydor Records albums
Albums recorded at Trident Studios